Ariocarpus fissuratus (formerly known as Anhalonium fissuratus) is a species of cactus found in small numbers in northern Mexico and Texas in the United States. Common names include living rock cactus, false peyote, chautle, dry whiskey and star cactus.

Description

This cactus consists of many small tubercles growing from a large tap root. They are usually solitary, rarely giving rise to side shoots from old areoles. The plant is greyish-green in color, sometimes taking on a yellowish tint with age. Its growth rate is extremely slow. A. fissuratus is naturally camouflaged in its habitat, making it difficult to spot.  When they are found, it is usually due to their pinkish flowers which bloom in October and early November.

Cultivation

In cultivation, Ariocarpus fissuratus is often grafted to a faster-growing columnar cactus to speed growth, as they would generally take at least a decade to reach maturity on their own.  They require very little water and fertilizer, a good amount of light, and a loose sandy soil with good drainage.

Poaching 
Tens of thousands of this protected Texas cacti are annually removed Illegally.
Poaching has even extended to Big Bend National Park.  Smugglers have taken entire populations of A. fissuratus, primarily for collectors, mainly in Europe and Asia. Loss of such a wide range of genetic variation weakens the species' chances of future survival.
According to the U.S. Department of Justice, the cactus is protected by the Convention on International Trade in Endangered Species of Wild Fauna and Flora (CITES).<ref>U.S. Attorney’s Office [" El Paso Man Pleads Guilty to Role in Scheme to Sell Protected Cacti" https://www.justice.gov/usao-wdtx/pr/el-paso-man-pleads-guilty-role-scheme-sell-protected-cacti], ' Department of Justice , June 2020. Retrieved 21 June 2020.</ref>

PsychoactivityAriocarpus fissuratus'' is a unique species in that it has been used by Native American tribes as a mind-altering substance, usually only as a substitute for peyote.  While it does not contain mescaline like species such as peyote,  it has been found to contain other centrally active substances, such as N-methyltyramine and hordenine, albeit in doses too small to be active.

Notes

References
Ratsch, C. (2005). The Encyclopedia of Psychoactive Plants: Ethnopharmocology and its Applications, Vermont: Park Street Press.

External links

Living-rocks.com
Living-rocks.com
Desert-tropicals.com

fissuratus
Cacti of Mexico
Cacti of the United States
Flora of Chihuahua (state)
Flora of Coahuila
Flora of Durango
Flora of San Luis Potosí
Flora of Texas
Flora of Zacatecas
Flora of the Chihuahuan Desert
Plants described in 1894
Taxa named by George Engelmann
Garden plants of North America